Franco Valentín 'Turu' Flores (born 28 May 1993) is an Argentine professional footballer who plays as a central defender for Azerbaijan Premier League club Keşla.

Career

Club
On 17 June 2019, Keşla announced the signing of Flores on a one-year contract.

On 13 January 2022, Flores returned to Keşla, signing a contract until the end of the 2021–22 season.

References

External links
 BDFA profile
 Primera statistics FutbolXXI

1993 births
Living people
People from Pergamino
Argentine footballers
Argentine expatriate footballers
Association football defenders
Argentinos Juniors footballers
Club Atlético Douglas Haig players
Club Atlético Brown footballers
Lleida Esportiu footballers
Chiapas F.C. footballers
Alki Oroklini players
Shamakhi FK players
Argentine Primera División players
Primera Nacional players
Torneo Federal A players
Segunda División B players
Azerbaijan Premier League players
Argentine expatriate sportspeople in Cyprus
Expatriate footballers in Cyprus
Expatriate footballers in Azerbaijan
Argentine expatriate sportspeople in Mexico
Expatriate footballers in Mexico
Argentine expatriate sportspeople in Spain
Expatriate footballers in Spain
Argentine expatriate sportspeople in Azerbaijan
Sportspeople from Buenos Aires Province